Rosario de los Milagros Prieto Pérez (born April 13, 1942, in Dominican Republic) better known as Rosario Prieto is a Dominican-born actress, naturalized Venezuelan, who has developed her career in Venezuela.

Biography 
When she was one and a half years old, Rosario Prieto arrived in Venezuela with her parents, who were political refugees. Despite being born in the Dominican Republic, the actress identifies as Venezuelan.

Personal life 
One day, when Rosario Prieto was dancing on the stage of "El Show de Renny" she met Chucho Sanoja, director of the RCTV orchestra. She fell in love married him. She then began to explore the world of singing, since she was part of the orchestra led by her husband and studied with master Eduardo Lanz. Two years after being married, Rosario Prieto had her first daughter named María Eugenia Sanoja Prieto and later, three sons who died. She then traveled to the United States where she studied choreography upon returning to Venezuela, worked for thirteen years on the newly opened CVTV channel. During this time, the actress had her second daughter, Carolina Prieto de Fernández.

Career 
Jorge Citino was the choreographer of that program in 1959 and, in his arduous search for all the academies of Caracas to find a classical dancer, he selected Rosario Prieto to be part of "El Show de Renny." One day, when Rosario Prieto was dancing on the stage of "El Show de Renny," she met Chucho Sanoja, director of the RCTV orchestra. She fell in love married him. She then began to explore the world of singing, since she was part of the orchestra led by her husband and studied with master Eduardo Lanz. As a member of the RCTV orchestra, which had many contracts with international record companies, Rosario Prieto had the opportunity to travel to different countries. In some nations such as Mexico, the United States and Spain, she studied as a listener in the performing arts schools. While she traveled, Prieto gained interest in acting. So she decided to take formal classes in Venezuela with professor Luis Salazar, the founder of a school of acting training in the country. Rosario Prieto debuted as an actress on RCTV in the mid-1960s. She then traveled to the United States where she studied choreography and, upon returning to Venezuela in 1964, worked in the first program of "El Club del Clan"  along with “the brothers” José and Richard Hernandez produced by the recently opened CVTV channel. In 1979, she returned to RCTV and worked uninterrupted until the day of its closure, both in dramatic productions and in different genres: humor, competitions, varieties, and more. In addition to all this, Rosario Prieto has a training school of artistic talent called Buscando el Actor que todos llevamos dentro witch has functioned in Caracas and in several other regions of the country. She has taught acting workshops on television, voice and diction, text analysis and body language, as well as various talks on empirical and spiritual content.

Filmography

Television

Movies

Awards and nominations

References 

Dominican Republic emigrants to Venezuela
Venezuelan television actresses
1942 births
Living people
Venezuelan telenovela actresses
20th-century Venezuelan actresses
21st-century Venezuelan actresses